This is a list of current and defunct automobile manufacturers of India.

Current manufacturers

Major Indian companies

Others manufactures
 Ashok Leyland (1948–present)
 Bajaj Auto (1945–present)
 Eicher Motors (1948–present)
 Force Motors (1958–present)

Minor manufacturers
 Hindustan Motors (1942-present)
 Hradyesh (2011–present)
 ICML (2003–present)
 Kerala Automobiles Limited (1984–present)
 Premier (1944–present)
 Tara International (1978–present)
 Vehicle Factory Jabalpur (1969–present)

Foreign manufacturers building, or in a joint venture, in India

Former manufacturers

 Chinkara Motors (2003–2016)
 Multix (2015–2018), a joint venture by Eicher Motors and Polaris Industries
 Rajah Motors (1981–2009)
 San Motors (1996–2013)
 Sipani (1978–1997)
 Standard Motor Products (1948–2006)
 Tata Motors (discontinued marques and subsidiaries)
 Tamo (2016–2017)

Former foreign manufacturers and joint ventures

 Daewoo Motors India (1995-2003)
 FCA India Automobiles (discontinued marques and subsidiaries)
 Fiat India (1996–2018)
 Ford India (1995–2021)
 General Motors India (1995–2017)
 Chevrolet India (2003–2017)
 Opel India (1996–2006)
 Mahindra Renault (2007–2010)
 Swaraj Mazda (1983–2011)

See also
 Automotive industry in India
 List of car manufacturers

References

India
Automobile manufacturers

uk:Список автовиробників Індії